Frances Scott "Scottie" Fitzgerald (October 26, 1921 – June 18, 1986) was an American writer and journalist and the only child of novelist F. Scott Fitzgerald and Zelda Sayre Fitzgerald. She worked for The Washington Post, The New Yorker, The Northern Virginia Sun, and others, and was a prominent member of the Democratic Party. She was inducted into the Alabama Women's Hall of Fame in 1992.

Early life 

Fitzgerald was born in Saint Paul, Minnesota. Upon her birth, her mother supposedly remarked that she hoped Scottie would be a "beautiful little fool", which Daisy Buchanan also says in The Great Gatsby, F. Scott Fitzgerald's best-known novel. Scottie Fitzgerald spent her childhood moving from place to place with her parents – including time in Paris and Antibes in France, and five years' residence in a beach house her father rented on the edge of Chesapeake Bay not far from Baltimore, Maryland. She attended Calvert School and briefly attended the Bryn Mawr School while her mother Zelda received treatment at Sheppard Pratt Hospital.

In 1936, Fitzgerald began attending the Ethel Walker School, a boarding school in Connecticut, but was expelled for sneaking away from campus in order to hitchhike to Yale. She attended Vassar College. Hoping that she would not repeat his academic failures, her father wrote letters to her urging her to take rigorous classes and work hard. She graduated from Vassar in 1942, seventeen months after her father's death.

Personal life and career 
Fitzgerald and her first husband, Samuel Jackson "Jack" Lanahan, a prominent Washington lawyer, were popular hosts in Washington in the 1950s and 1960s. During this period, she wrote musical comedies about the Washington social scene that were performed annually to benefit the Multiple Sclerosis Society of Washington. Her show Onward and Upward with the Arts was considered for a Broadway run by producer David Merrick.

Fitzgerald had four children with her first husband: Thomas Addison Lanahan; Eleanor Anne Lanahan; Samuel Jackson Lanahan, Jr.; and Cecilia Scott Lanahan. Their eldest child, Thomas, known as "Tim", committed suicide at the age of 27 in 1973. Eleanor "Bobbie" Lanahan, an artist and writer, wrote a biography of her mother, Scottie, The Daughter of ... The Life of Frances Scott Fitzgerald Lanahan Smith (1995). Fitzgerald's second marriage, to Grove Smith, ended in divorce in 1979.

Later life and death 
In 1973, when Fitzgerald was legally separated from husband Grove Smith, she moved from Washington, D.C. to her mother's home town of Montgomery, Alabama. According to a book authored by her daughter Eleanor after her death, she told her family and many friends that she was moving far away from Washington because she was disgusted by constant news reports of the Watergate scandal.

Several months after Fitzgerald's relocation, she was attending a party in Montgomery when she was informed via long-distance telephone call of her son's suicide. She made polite excuses about leaving the party without giving the other guests any clue as to what had happened.

Fitzgerald became active in the state Democratic Party in Alabama, and worked with Walter Mondale during his campaign trips to Montgomery over the years. During the 12 years she lived in Montgomery before developing throat cancer, she traveled frequently to visit her three surviving children and grandchildren, none of whom lived near Alabama.

Fitzgerald died at her Montgomery home from throat cancer in 1986, aged 64. Shortly before she died, she told her three surviving children that she wished she had quit cigarette smoking many years earlier. She is buried next to her parents in Rockville, Maryland.

References

External links 
 The Scottie Fitzgerald Smith Papers, Vassar College Archives and Special Collections Library

1921 births
American women journalists
American people of Irish descent
Writers from Saint Paul, Minnesota
Writers from Montgomery, Alabama
1986 deaths
Vassar College alumni
20th-century American writers
Journalists from Alabama
Bryn Mawr School people
20th-century American journalists
20th-century American women